Grums Municipality (Grums kommun) is a municipality in Värmland County in west central Sweden. Its seat is located in the town of Grums, with about 5,200 inhabitants.

As so many of the municipalities of Sweden the present entity was created in 1971. The market town (köping) Grums  (instituted as such in 1948) was amalgamated with Ed and the parish Värmskog from the dissolved Stavnäs Municipality, thus forming Grums Municipality.

Geographically it is situated on the north-west shore of Lake Vänern in the province of Värmland. Transportations are reliable with the European route E18 intersecting the town.

Historically the town was the center of the historical jurisdiction Grums Hundred, with its oldest seal stemming from 1617. The seal showed an accurate image of the local church.

The coat of arms is derived from that of the hundred. It also depicts three saw-blades, symbolizing the forest industry.

The local political party is known as Grums medborgarparti, abbreviated gm. It was founded in 1994, in the wake of the short-lived unconventional party Ny Demokrati. The party was the municipality's third largest in the election of 1994 and 1998.

Localities
Grums (seat)
Slottsbron
Segmon
Borgvik
Liljedal

In addition, the village Värmskog, with 65 inhabitants (2000), is known as the birthplace of inventor Lars Magnus Ericsson.

References

External links

Grums Municipality - Official site
grums.just.nu 

Municipalities of Värmland County